Xu Tianyuan (born 8 May 1997) is a Chinese footballer who currently plays for Chinese Super League side Hebei China Fortune.

Club career
Xu Tianyuan transferred to Chinese Super League side Hebei China Fortune in February 2017. He made his senior debut on 3 March 2018 in a 1–1 away draw against Tianjin TEDA, coming on as a substitute for Hu Rentian in the 84th minute.

Career statistics
.

References

External links
 

1997 births
Living people
Chinese footballers
Footballers from Shanghai
Hebei F.C. players
Chinese Super League players
Association football midfielders